Rod Johnson may refer to:

 Rod Johnson (footballer) (1945–2019), English retired football player
 Rod Johnson (politician), former Oregon state legislator
 Rod Johnson (programmer), founder of the Spring Framework, an open source application framework for Java

See also
 Rodney Johnson (disambiguation)